Zotz! is a 1962 American fantasy comedy film produced and directed by William Castle, and starring Tom Poston, Julia Meade, Jim Backus, Fred Clark, and Cecil Kellaway. It is about a man obtaining magical powers from a god of an ancient civilization. It is based on Walter Karig's 1947 novel.

Plot
A brilliant but peculiar professor of Ancient Eastern languages, Jonathan Jones, finds that an amulet sent to his niece Cynthia by a boyfriend from an archeological dig has magical powers.

Whoever has the amulet in their possession can 1) cause great pain by pointing at another living creature, 2) cause time to go into slow motion by saying the word "Zotz!", or 3) cause instant death by simultaneously pointing and saying "Zotz!". Both government and Communist agents immediately develop an interest in the amulet's possible military use. (This is a metaphor for the age of nuclear weapons, as the novel was written two years after atomic bombings of Hiroshima and Nagasaki).

In the meantime, Jones and rival professor Kellgore are both in line for a promotion to take over from retiring Dean Updike as head of this California university's language department. A new colleague and possible romantic interest, Professor Fenster, is startled by Jones' behavior, particularly at a party thrown by Updike's wife that turns into chaos. Near the end of the movie, Jones refers to Fenster as Mrs. Jones, inferring that they were either already married, or that they were going to get married soon.

Professor Fenster’s first appearance occurs moments after Jones first mentioned the name of Zotz in one of the early scenes of the movie. She was standing naked just outside one of the windows of his home during a thunderstorm that Jones (unintentionally) just so happened to conjure up when he mentioned Zotz. Shocked and embarrassed by her nakedness, he quickly closed the window on her. Feeling somewhat sorry for her, though, he waved her over to go to the front door. Shortly after Jones handed her his suit coat so that she could cover her private parts, he temporarily permitted her to come into the house. When firmly asked by Jones to leave, so as not give the wrong immoral impression to his niece who was asleep  upstairs in her bedroom, Fenster refused to go back out into the storm half-naked. Fenster emphatically explained to Jones, in hopes that he would sympathize with her, that she was “hurrying along, trying to beat out this sudden storm,” when she was apparently struck by lightning. Moreover, she also told Jones that her clothes were blown off by the electrostatic charge embedded within the bolt that hit her. After listening to her seemingly “far-fetched” story, he mentioned that he remembered hearing about an actual incident where someone’s clothes were literally torn from their body as a direct result of being struck by lightning. Finally realizing that she was telling the truth, Jones lent Fenster some of his niece’s clothes. Now, fully clothed and armed with an umbrella that Jones also lent her, Fenster opens the door to brave the elements and go home. The storm was, however, now over and the umbrella was no longer needed.

Cast
 Tom Poston as Professor Jonathan Jones
 Zeme North as Cynthia Jones
 Julia Meade as Professor Virginia Fenster
 Jim Backus as Professor Kellgore
 Cecil Kellaway as Dean Updike
 Margaret Dumont as Persephone Updike
 Fred Clark as General Bullivar

Promotion
During the initial theatrical run, theater patrons received a full-size plastic replica of the amulet as a promotional item. In color, size and design, the replicas were essentially identical to the film amulet, with the additional feature of a small hole drilled at the top, for a key chain.

DVD release
On October 20, 2009, Zotz! was released on DVD  by Sony Pictures as part of The William Castle Collection box set.

See also
 List of American films of 1962

References

External links

1962 films
American spy comedy films
Columbia Pictures films
1960s English-language films
1960s fantasy comedy films
Films based on American novels
Films directed by William Castle
1960s spy comedy films
1962 comedy films
1960s American films